Scopula pudicaria  is a moth of the  family Geometridae. It is found from north-eastern China to south-eastern Russia, Korea and Japan.

References

Moths described in 1861
pudicaria
Moths of Asia